A.S.D. S.S. Lazio calcio a 5, also known as just Lazio is an Italian five-a-side football club based in Rome, Italy. Is the five-a-side section of  multi-sport club . The male and female team of Lazio Calcio a 5 played in male Serie A and female Serie A league.

Honours
Serie A1: 1
  1997-98

Coppa Italia: 4
 1998, 1999, 2003, 2011

See also
 S.S. Lazio

References

External links
  

Futsal clubs in Italy
S.S. Lazio
Football clubs in Rome